Wilmington High School is the public high school for the town of Wilmington, Massachusetts, United States. It is home to the Wilmington Wildcats. Ryan Gendron is the principal. Jonathan Merenda and Mark Staffier both serve as vice principals.

New High School Project

Wilmington was approved by the state of Massachusetts to build a new High school. On January 9, 2013 it was announced the schools gymnasium would be torn down. Many saw this to be a big step forward in the construction of a much-needed 21st-century education for the students of Wilmington. Nearly two years after the demolition of the gymnasium, the new high school was completed. An event celebrating the school's completion was held on Sunday, February 22, 2015, and students moved into the new school on February 24, 2015. Demolition of the old high school began in March 2015, and the rest of the athletic facilities were demolished by the end of 2015.

Rotating Schedule
The school has a four-day schedule with four classes a day including a lunch block. Each class is an hour and a half long, with three different half-hour lunch periods throughout the day. On White Days, there is a W2 period which functions as a study hall.
Blue 1: 1-2-3-4 
White 1:  1-2-3-4
Blue 4: 4-2-3-1
White 4: 4-2-3-1

Sports 
In 2012, the Wilmington High School Boys' Hockey Team won the school's first Division 2 state championship.

In 2013, the Wilmington High School Boys' Hockey Team won the Division 2 state championship again, beating Franklin High School in the championship game for the second year in a row.

On February 2, 2013, the boys' varsity indoor track team lost to neighboring Burlington in its final meet. This ended an otherwise undefeated season. The team finished second in its league. They went on to lose to Burlington's track team again in the Spring, finishing second in the league. However, they were given the Division 3 Sportsmanship award. The boys' soccer team won the Middlesex league small division in 2013.

Notable alumni 
 Jason Bere, former MLB pitcher
 Ryland Blackinton, guitarist of Cobra Starship
 Mike Esposito, former NFL player
 David G. Hartwell, science fiction editor

References

External links
 Wilmington High School Official site
 http://profiles.doe.mass.edu/analysis/default.aspx?orgcode=03420505&orgtypecode=6&

Schools in Middlesex County, Massachusetts
Buildings and structures in Wilmington, Massachusetts
Public high schools in Massachusetts